The Skating Rink (La Pista de Hielo in Spanish) is a novel by the Chilean author Roberto Bolaño. A translation from the Spanish by Chris Andrews was published by New Directions in August, 2009.

David Sawer adapted it as an opera by the same name, first performed in July 2018.

Summary

Set in the seaside town of Z, on the Costa Brava, north of Barcelona, The Skating Rink is told by three male narrators (one Mexican, one Chilean, and one Spaniard), revolving around a beautiful figure-skating champion, Nuria Martí. When she is suddenly dropped from the Olympic team, a pompous but besotted civil servant secretly builds a skating rink in a local ruin of a mansion, using public funds. But Nuria has affairs, provokes jealousy, and the skating rink becomes a crime scene.

References 

1993 Chilean novels
Works by Roberto Bolaño
Novels adapted into operas